Ay Yapım is a media production company founded by Kerem Çatay in 2005. The company was once a Turkish partner of "Sparks Network", which has partners in 20 countries around the world. It is one of the biggest production companies in Turkey. Its head office is located in Istanbul, Turkey. Its productions are also broadcast on television in different countries. The script rights of the TV series Aşk-ı Memnu were purchased by Telemundo Television Studios broadcasting in the United States and re-shot under the name Pasión Prohibida.

Ay Yapım series and actors were nominated in different categories for the Seoul International Drama Awards. At the Seoul International Drama Awards, one of the prestigious organizations of the television world, Ezel series "Special Prize" in 2012  In 2014, Medcezir received the "Silver Bird" award in the Best Serial Drama category.

Son series, produced by Ay Yapım in 2012, is being re-shot under the name "Runner" to be broadcast on primetime by ABC channel in 2015. The Runner stars Paula Patton and Brent Sexton.

Productions

TV and internet series and movies

Television programs
Sen Hakediyorsun
Süpermarket
Koş Dur Eğlen
Kadının Gücü
Kadınlar ve Erkekler
Hülya Avşar ile Sen Bilirsin
Ece ile Erkenden
Aşk Oyunu
Büyüle Beni
Cenk mi Erdem mi?

Awards 
 Tuba Büyüküstün (20 Dakika) 2014, International Emmy Awards, Best Foreign Actress 2014 (Best Actress) -She reached the finals-
 Engin Akyürek (Kara Para Aşk) 2015 , International Emmy Awards, Best Foreign Actor 2015 (Best Actor) -He reached the finals-
 Kara Sevda (TV series) 2017, International Emmy Awards, Best Foreign TV Series 2017 (Best Telenovela) -Won-
Cesur ve Güzel (TV series) 2018, International Emmy Awards. Best TV Series 2018 (Best Telenovela) -Reached the Finals-
Haluk Bilginer (Şahsiyet) 2019, International Emmy Awards, Best Actor 2019 (Best Model'') -Won-

External links 
Ay Yapım Official Website

References 

Film production companies of Turkey